Uday Shankar (1900–1977) was an Indian dancer and choreographer

Uday Shankar may also refer to:
Uday Shankar (businessman), born 1962, current head of Star India and The Walt Disney Company India
Uday Shankar Pani, Indian filmmaker
Chi. Udayashankar, Indian screenwriter and lyricist